Guilherme Capra Bacinello (born 3 October 1986), commonly known as Cascavel, is a Portuguese former professional footballer who played as a striker.

Club career
A product of hometown Vitória de Guimarães's youth system, Guimarães-born Cascavel made his senior debut with G.D. União Torcatense in the third division, on loan. During his spell at the neighbouring side, he was involved in a lawsuit concerning the acquisition of his Portuguese nationality after his alleged irregular use in three matches. His team was relegated at the end of the season after ranking last, and his parent club also released him, with the player going on to resume his career in the same tier.

Cascavel signed with C.D. Trofense of the Segunda Liga ahead of the 2007–08 campaign, appearing rarely (only six competitive matches) as they achieved a first-ever Primeira Liga promotion. In January 2008, he returned to division three and joined Moreirense F.C. on loan.

On 3 August 2009, after already having served a loan spell with the club, Cascavel moved to S.C. Freamunde on a permanent basis. He ranked fifth in the goalscoring charts, as they narrowly escaped relegation from the second division.

For 2010–11, Cascavel continued in the second tier, signing a one-year deal with F.C. Penafiel. In June 2011 he moved to Cyprus with AEP Paphos FC but, on 10 January of the following year, his contract was terminated by mutual consent.

Personal life
Cascavel's father, Paulo Roberto, also nicknamed Cascavel, was also a footballer and a striker. He too played several seasons in Portugal, most notably with Guimarães and Sporting CP.

References

External links

1986 births
Living people
Portuguese people of Brazilian descent
Sportspeople from Guimarães
Portuguese footballers
Association football forwards
Liga Portugal 2 players
Segunda Divisão players
Vitória S.C. players
GD Bragança players
AC Vila Meã players
C.D. Trofense players
Moreirense F.C. players
S.C. Freamunde players
F.C. Penafiel players
Cypriot Second Division players
AEP Paphos FC players
Portuguese expatriate footballers
Expatriate footballers in Cyprus
Portuguese expatriate sportspeople in Cyprus